Élie Fallu (born March 2, 1932) is a politician in the Canadian province of Quebec, who was a two-term member of the National Assembly of Quebec, representing the district of Terrebonne in 1976-1981 and the district of Groulx in 1981–1985. He is a member of the Parti Québécois.

He was born in 1932 in the Gaspésie area to a farming household, attended University of Ottawa, Université de Montréal, Université Laval, University of Sorbonne and holds a PhD in History.

He was a card-carrying member of the Progressive Conservative Party of Canada in 1957 and 1958.

He ran for a seat in the Parliament of Quebec in 1976, against Liberal incumbent Denis Hardy and won with 51% of the vote.  He was re-elected in a two-way race in 1981 with 57% of the vote, but was narrowly defeated in 1985, with 47% of the vote, against Liberal candidate Madeleine Bleau.

Fallu served as a cabinet member in the administrations of Premiers René Lévesque and Pierre-Marc Johnson.

He also was mayor of Sainte-Thérèse, Quebec from 1987 until 2005.

References

External links 
 

Living people
1932 births
Parti Québécois MNAs
University of Paris alumni
Université de Montréal alumni
People from Gaspésie–Îles-de-la-Madeleine
Canadian expatriates in France